William Smith (15??-16??) was an English sonneteer, poet, and friend of Edmund Spenser. He participated in The Phoenix Nest (1593), England's Helicon (1600) and published a sonnet sequence Chloris or The Complaint of the passionate despised Shepheard in 1596.

Works
Smith in 1596 published a collection of sonnets, entitled Chloris, or the Complaint of the passionate despised Shepheard, printed by Edmund Bollifant, 1596. The volume opens with two sonnets, inscribed "To the most excellent and learned shepheard, Collin Cloute" (i.e. Spenser), and signed "W. Smith"; in a third sonnet addressed to Spenser at the close of the book Smith calls Spenser his patron. The content consists of 48 sonnets, and a poem in 20 lines, called Corins Dreame of the faire Chloris. Corins Dreame was transferred to England's Helicon (1600 and 1614). The work was reprinted in Edward Arber's English Garner, viii. 171 sqq.

Attributions
Verse signed "W. S." has sometimes been attributed to Smith, but purely as a matter of conjecture. Cases include commendatory verse for John Grange's Golden Aphroditis, 1577, and Nicholas Breton's Wil of Wit, 1606.

Richard Heber owned a manuscript A New Yeares Guift, or a posie upon certen flowers, described as presented to Mary Sidney by the "author of Chloris" ; it is now in the British Library, MS. Addit. 35186. Plays signed "W. Smith" assigned at some points to Smith were by Wentworth Smith.

The above article on William Smith depends on the authority of Sidney Lee cited below, but Lee is not accurate or reliable. See major correction entered above.

Notes

Attribution

Further reading
Lawrence A. Sasek (ed.) (1970) The Poems of William Smith. Louisiana State University Press, .

External links
 
 

16th-century English poets
Year of death unknown
Year of birth unknown
English male poets